Marine Corps Air Station Kaneohe Bay or MCAS Kaneohe Bay  is a United States Marine Corps (USMC) airfield located within the Marine Corps Base Hawaii complex, formerly known as Marine Corps Air Facility (MCAF) Kaneohe Bay or Naval Air Station (NAS) Kaneohe Bay. It is located two miles (3 km) northeast of the central business district of Kaneohe, in Honolulu County, Hawaii, United States. The airfield has one runway (4/22) with a 7,771 x 200 ft (2,369 x 61 m) asphalt surface.

History

Fort Hase and NAS Kaneohe Bay
The United States Army acquired  of the peninsula when President Woodrow Wilson signed executive order 2900 establishing the Kuwaaohe Military Reservation.  Little is known about the operations of the fort, however, at the end of World War I, the military property was leased for ranching.  In 1939, Kuwaaohe was reactivated, subjected to many name changes to include Camp Ulupa’u, and eventually named Fort Hase.

Prior to and during World War II, Fort Hase grew from a humble beginning as a defense battalion to a major unit of the Windward Coastal Artillery Command.  U.S. Navy planners began to eye the peninsula in 1939 as the home of a strategic seaplane base.  They liked the isolated location, the flat plains for an airfield and the probability of flights into prevailing trade winds.  In 1939, the Navy acquired  of the peninsula for use of the PBY Catalina patrol seaplanes for long-range reconnaissance flights.  One year later, the Navy owned all of the Mokapu Peninsula except for Fort Hase.  In 1939 the Navy awarded a base construction contract to the Pacific Naval Air Base Contractors consortituim (PNABC). Most of the original contract work at Kaneohe had been completed when the Navy transferred what was undone to the Seabees of the 56th Naval Construction Battalion on 1 April 1943.  The 112th CB was tasked with adding a second runway 400' x 5,000' to the airfield.  That was completed by the men of the 74th CB.

December 7, 1941, the Imperial Japanese Navy attacked the air station minutes prior to the attack on Pearl Harbor.  Of the 36 Catalinas stationed here, 27 were destroyed and six others were damaged, along with 18 sailors who perished in the attack.  The first Japanese aircraft destroyed in action were shot down at Kaneohe, along with Aviation Ordnanceman Chief Petty Officer John William Finn becoming one of the first Medal of Honor recipients of World War II for valor on that day.

During the war, the air station was a major training base in the Pacific Theater.  The Fleet Gunnery School trained thousands of Navy gunners.  There was a school for celestial navigation, sonar, aircraft recognition, and turret operations.  Flight instructors also trained Navy and Marine Corps aviators in flight operations prior to being sent to a forward combat area.  Following the war, Fort Hase had become a skeleton outpost and the air station consisted of limited air operations, a small security detachment, and a federal communications center.

In November 1958 the first of the Pacific Missile Impact Location System for the Navy's Pacific Missile Range (PMR) was operational at the station to monitor Intermediate Range Ballistic Missile (IRBM) test impacts northeast of Hawaii.

Marine Operations

In 1949, the Navy decommissioned the air station. On January 15, 1952 the U.S. Marine Corps recommissioned the idle airfield Marine Corps Air Station Kaneohe Bay, making it an ideal training site for a combined air/ground team.  Station Operations and Headquarters Squadron supported flight operations until June 30, 1972, when Station Operations and Maintenance Squadron (SOMS) was commissioned in its place. SOMS served until it was disbanded on July 30, 1994. Marine Corps Air Facility Kaneohe Bay was formed on that date and continues today to serve the operational needs of the aviation community.

On May 28, 1987, the station was listed as a historic district on the National Register of Historic Places and a National Historic Landmark, in recognition of its role in World War II.

Following the 1993 Base Realignment and Closure Commission decision to close Naval Air Station Barbers Point, the base acquired four Navy P-3 Orion patrol squadrons and one SH-60 Seahawk anti-submarine squadron in 1999.  Today there are almost 10,000 active duty Navy and Marine Corps personnel there, directed by Marine Aircraft Group 24 and Navy Patrol and Reconnaissance Wing 2.

The installation was re-designated as an Air Station (vice an Air Facility) in May 2009. At the same time, the airfield was named for Major general Marion Eugene Carl, and the USMC announced that new squadrons would be stationed there.

On January 15, 2016, two Marine helicopters from the air station collided over the North Shore of Oahu, leaving twelve U.S. Marines missing and feared dead.

Based units 
Flying and notable non-flying units based at MCAS Kaneohe Bay.

United States Marine Corps 
Marine Corps Installations – Pacific

 Headquarters and Headquarters Squadron – C-20G Gulfstream IV

1st Marine Aircraft Wing

 Marine Aircraft Group 24
 Marine Aviation Logistics Squadron 24 (MALS-24)
 Marine Unmanned Aerial Vehicle Squadron 3 (VMU-3) – RQ-21A Blackjack
 Marine Medium Tilt-Rotor Squadron 268 (VMM-268) – MV-22B Osprey
Marine Medium Tilt-Rotor Squadron 363 (VMM-363) – MV-22B Osprey
 Marine Aerial Refueler Transport Squadron 153 (VMGR-153) – Lockheed Martin KC-130J

United States Navy 

 Commander, Helicopter Maritime Strike Wing Pacific (CHMSWP)
 Helicopter Maritime Strike Squadron 37 (HSM-37) – MH-60R
 Commander, Fleet Logistics Support Wing (CFLSW)
 Fleet Logistics Support Squadron 51 (VR-51) – C-40A Clipper

Insignia

See also
 List of National Historic Landmarks in Hawaii
 National Register of Historic Places listings in Oahu
 List of United States Marine Corps installations
 List of airports in Hawaii
 Naval Base Hawaii

References

External links

Official website
USMC Air Station Kaneohe Bay Overview & PCS Information (MarineCorpsUSA.org)

Kaneohe Bay on GlobalSecurity.org
WWII Era Photos of Kaneohe Bay

United States Marine Corps air stations
Military facilities in Hawaii
Airports in Hawaii
Buildings and structures in Honolulu County, Hawaii
Transportation in Honolulu County, Hawaii
Historic American Buildings Survey in Hawaii
Forts on the National Register of Historic Places in Hawaii
World War II on the National Register of Historic Places in Hawaii
Military airbases established in 1939
1939 establishments in Hawaii
Historic districts on the National Register of Historic Places in Hawaii
National Register of Historic Places in Honolulu County, Hawaii
National Historic Landmarks in Hawaii